Western Wayne School District is a third-class school district in Wayne County, Pennsylvania. The district's population was 19,292 at the time of the 2010 United States Census.

Western Wayne was formed in 1969. It serves the townships of Canaan, Lake, Salem, South Canaan,  Sterling, and a portion of Clinton.  The borough of Waymart is also part of the Western Wayne School District. The District encompasses . The school district is 25 miles north and east of the city of Scranton in the Northeastern region of Pennsylvania. In 2009, the District residents’ per capita income was $16,259, while the median family income was $39,971. In the Commonwealth of Pennsylvania, the median family income was $49,501  and the United States median family income was $49,445, in 2010.

Western Wayne School District operates four schools:
 R.D. Wilson Elementary (located in Waymart)
 EverGreen Elementary (located in Lake Ariel, Pennsylvania)
 Western Wayne Middle School (located in South Caanan Twp (Varden))
 Western Wayne High School (also in South Caanan (Varden))

Regions and constituent municipalities
The district is divided into three regions, which include the following municipalities:

Region I
Canaan Township
Clinton Township (partially in the Forest City Regional School District)
Waymart Borough

Region II
Lake Township
South Canaan Township

Region III
Salem Township
Sterling Township

Extracurriculars
The Western Wayne School District offers a wide variety of clubs, activities and an extensive sports program.

Sports
The District funds:

Boys
Baseball - AAA
Basketball- AAA
Cross Country - AA
Football - AAA
Golf - AAA
Soccer - AA
Tennis - AA
Track and Field - AAA
Volleyball - AA
Wrestling	- AA

Girls
Basketball - AAA
Cross Country - AA
Soccer (Fall) - AA
Softball - AAA
Girls' Tennis - AA
Track and Field - AAA
Volleyball - AA

Middle School Sports

Boys
Baseball
Basketball
Cross Country
Football
Soccer
Track and Field
Wrestling	

Girls
Basketball
Cross Country
Softball
Track and Field

According to PIAA directory June 2013

References

External links
Western Wayne School District

School districts in Wayne County, Pennsylvania